The Heritage Roads scheme was implemented in 2001 by the Singapore government to identify and protect roads whereby there are lush road-side trees, often so dense that they create "green walls" and even "green tunnels". Concerns that rapid urban development will result in the removal of these trees especially due to the widening or realignment of these roads, the authorities identified 5 roads from a list of 55 suggested by the National Parks Board. The remaining roads were placed on a watchlist to be closely monitored, and may be added to the scheme later.

History 
As part of Tengah Air Base's expansion, portions of Lim Chu Kang Road, a heritage road, will be closed off.

List of heritage roads
Arcadia Road
Lim Chu Kang Road
Mandai Road
Mount Pleasant Road
South Buona Vista Road

Roads on watchlist include
Goodwood Hill
Lornie Road
Loyang Avenue
Nassim Road
Punggol Road
Redhill Close
Upper Thomson Road
Yishun Avenue 5
Yuan Ching Road

References

External links
Heritage roads

Heritage registers in Singapore
Natural history of Singapore
Roads in Singapore
Singapore geography-related lists
Roads